Laurentides was a federal electoral district in Quebec, Canada, that was represented in the House of Commons of Canada from 1988 to 2003.

This riding was created in 1987 from Labelle riding. It was abolished in 2003, and redistributed between Laurentides—Labelle and Rivière-du-Nord   
 
Laurentides initially consisted of the towns of Estérel, Sainte-Adèle, Sainte-Agathe-des-Monts, Saint-Antoine and Saint-Jérôme, and parts of the Counties of Labelle and Montcalm.

In 1996, the riding was redefined to consist of the cities of Estérel, Saint-Antoine, Saint-Jérôme, Saint-Jovite, Sainte-Adèle and Sainte-Agathe-des-Monts, and parts of the County Regional Municipalities of Les Pays-d'en-Haut, La Rivière-du-Nord, and Le Laurentides.

Members of Parliament

This riding elected the following Members of Parliament:

Electoral history

See also 

 List of Canadian federal electoral districts
 Past Canadian electoral districts

External links 
 Riding history from the Library of Parliament

Former federal electoral districts of Quebec
Saint-Jérôme
Sainte-Agathe-des-Monts